Scirpophaga ochroleuca is a moth in the family Crambidae. It was described by Edward Meyrick in 1882. It is found on New Guinea and in Australia, where it has been recorded from Queensland.

The wingspan is 15–18 mm for males and 19–29 mm for females. The forewings of the males are ochreous and the hindwings white with ochreous suffusion on the costal half. The forewings of the females are white, with pale ochreous suffusion. The hindwings are white with a pale ochreous-white anal tuft.

References

Moths described in 1882
Schoenobiinae
Moths of Oceania